Green Island is an island in Oyster Harbour located approximately  northeast of Albany in Western Australia.

History 
Green Island was named by George Vancouver, who also named Oyster Harbour when he visited the area in 1791. It is one of only four permanent pelican breeding grounds in Western Australia, the others being Mandurah, Shark Bay and Rockingham. The breeding pelicans can be seen from the Kalgan Queen Riverboat, as the Island itself is a reserve.

When the colony in Albany was first settled in 1826, Green Island was planted for vegetables.  By 1830 it supported a vegetable garden,  and a hut was erected on the island for the gardener to live in.

In 1827 a group of sealers took 5 Aborigines to Green Island to catch birds. The sealers rowed away, leaving the Aborigines behind, then returned the next day bringing water. The Aborigines attempted to take the boat, and the sealers fired on them killing one Aboriginal man. The remaining Aborigines were removed to Michaelmas Island and left there making "great lamentations".

In 1991 the government department Fisheries Western Australia granted a fish farm license to the company Ocean Foods who have leases north and northeast of Green Island where blue mussels are farmed.

Fauna 
The island is noted as an important breeding ground for small numbers of the Australian pelican.  It was estimated in 1993 that 7 active nests were located on the island.

References

Protected areas of Western Australia
Islands of the Great Southern (Western Australia)